Gertrud Franziska Gabriele Eysoldt (30 November 1870 – 6 January 1955) was a German actress. She appeared in more than fifteen films from 1923 to 1949.

Selected filmography

References

External links 

1870 births
1955 deaths
People from Pirna
People from the Kingdom of Saxony
German stage actresses
German film actresses
German silent film actresses
20th-century German actresses